Samuel Swan (1771, near Scotch Plains, New Jersey – August 24, 1844, Bound Brook, New Jersey), was a five-term U.S. Congressman and medical doctor.

After studying medicine, Swan began to practice in Bound Brook, from 1800 to 1806 and then moved to Somerville from 1806 to 1809.  He was elected to U.S. House of Representatives for the Seventeenth, Eighteenth, Nineteenth, Twentieth, and Twenty-first United States Congresses, serving from March 4, 1821, to March 3, 1831.  He was an at-large representative for all but his second term, during which he represented the 2nd congressional district.  He retired without seeking renomination.  Although he did not formally represent a party when elected to the House, he was eventually affiliated with the Whig Party.

After his congressional career, he returned to practicing medicine.

Before going to Washington, he also served as sheriff of Somerset County for two years and county clerk for 12 years.

He is buried in the Presbyterian Cemetery in Bound Brook.

External links

1771 births
1844 deaths
Physicians from New Jersey
People from Bound Brook, New Jersey
People from Scotch Plains, New Jersey
New Jersey National Republicans
New Jersey Whigs
19th-century American politicians
Democratic-Republican Party members of the United States House of Representatives from New Jersey
National Republican Party members of the United States House of Representatives